Inner Revolution is the sixth solo album by Adrian Belew, originally released in 1992. Recorded in the wake of Belew's divorce from his first wife Margaret, the album is a collection of 1960s inspired pop songs. Along with his trademark guitar, Belew plays bass guitar, drums and occasional keyboards. Several other musicians appear, including Bears drummer Chris Arduser, acoustic bassist Mike Barnett, and a string quartet on "Big Blue Sun". Inner Revolution was re-released in 2003 by Wounded Bird Records.

Track listing 
All tracks composed by Adrian Belew
"Inner Revolution" – 3:12
"This Is What I Believe In" – 3:28
"Standing In The Shadow" – 3:45
"Big Blue Sun" – 3:49
"Only A Dream" – 3:32
"Birds" – 2:22
"I’d Rather Be Right Here" – 3:08
"The War In The Gulf Between Us" – 3:29
"I Walk Alone" – 2:47
"Everything" – 2:55
"Heaven’s Bed" – 4:04
"Member Of The Tribe" – 3:11

Personnel

Musicians
 Adrian Belew – vocals, guitar, bass guitar, drums, percussion, piano, keyboards.
 Mike Barnett – double bass (2)
 Chris Arduser – drums (2-3, 11-12)
 Jean Dickinson – violin (4)
 Lizbeth Getman – viola (4)
 Alison Lee Jewer – violin, string arrangement (4)
 Martha Pickart – cello (4)

Technical
 Adrian Belew – producer
 Ron Fajerstein, Stan Hertzman – executive producers
 Rich Denhart – engineer
 Dan Harjung – assistant engineer
 Ted Jensen – mastering
 Sotto Vocé – cover design
 Michael Wilson – photography

References

Adrian Belew albums
1992 albums
Albums produced by Adrian Belew
Atlantic Records albums